The 2009–10 Latvian Hockey League season was the 19th season of the Latvian Hockey League, the top level of ice hockey in Latvia. Eight teams participated in the league, and Dinamo-Juniors Riga won the championship. Dinamo-Juniors Riga and Liepājas Metalurgs received a bye until the playoffs, as they played in the Belarusian Extraleague.

Regular season

Playoffs 
 Quarterfinals (Best of Five)
  DHK Latgale -  HK Liepājas Metalurgs II 1:3
  SC Energija -  HK Ozolnieki/Monarhs 1:3

Semifinals (Best of Five)
  HK Liepājas Metalurgs -  HK Liepājas Metalurgs II 3:0
  Dinamo-Juniors Riga -  HK Ozolnieki/Monarhs 3:1

Final (Best of Seven)
  Liepājas Metalurgs -  Dinamo-Juniors 3:4 (1:1,2:2,0:1)
  Liepājas Metalurgs –  Dinamo-Juniors 0:3 (0:1,0:0,0:2)
  Dinamo-Juniors -  Liepājas Metalurgs 4:1 (0:1,3:0,1:0)
  Dinamo-Juniors -  Liepājas Metalurgs 2:3 SO (0:0, 1:2, 1:0, 0:0, 0:1)
  Liepājas Metalurgs -  Dinamo-Juniors 2:3 OT (1:0,1:0,0:2,0:1)

External links
 Season on hockeyarchives.info

Latvian Hockey League
Latvian Hockey League seasons
Latvian